Joseph Walton (15 December 1868 – 1940) was an English footballer who played in the Football League for Darwen.

References

1868 births
1940 deaths
English footballers
Darwen F.C. players
English Football League players
Association football goalkeepers